Kalchat-e Heydarabad (also Romanized as Kalchāt-e Ḩeydarābād; also known as Kalchāt-e Valīābād) is a village in Esmailabad Rural District, in the Central District of Khash County, Sistan and Baluchestan Province, Iran. At the 2006 census, its population was 167, in 31 families.

References 

Populated places in Khash County